Robert Joseph Skarda (November 28, 1925 – February 15, 1994) was an American professional basketball player. He appeared in six games for the Tri-Cities Blackhawks in the National Basketball League during the 1947–48 season.

References

1925 births
1994 deaths
American men's basketball players
Basketball players from New York City
Forwards (basketball)
Guards (basketball)
Tri-Cities Blackhawks players
Tufts Jumbos men's basketball players
United States Navy personnel of World War II